Michelson-Morley Memorial Fountain, also known as the Michelson-Morley Monument and commonly called the "lipstick fountain," is located on the campus of  Case Western Reserve University in the University Circle neighborhood of Cleveland, Ohio. It was designed by William Behnke and built in 1973 in commemoration of the world-famous Michelson–Morley experiment.

Fountain

Description 
The sculpture is a chrome-plated steel cylinder with the top cut at a 45 degree angle. Cylinder is formed of 12 curved plates. The open top is cut at a 45 degree angle and the inside of the opening is painted black. The cylinder is supported above the water level of the small pool located underneath. The base housing the pool slopes from a 15 ft circle into a 25 ft (diameter) circle made from brickwork/paving stones. The overall setting is a paving stone surfaced plaza with benches and a circle of locust trees set 15 ft away, surrounding the fountain.

Meaning 

The undulating water symbolizes ether waves; the steel cylinder represents the ascending beam of light.

Experiment 
The Michelson–Morley experiment was conducted in 1887 by physicist Albert A. Michelson of Case School of Applied Science and chemist Edward W. Morley of Western Reserve University. This experiment proved the non-existence of the luminiferous ether and was later cited as circumstantial evidence in support of special relativity as proposed by Albert Einstein in 1905. Michelson became the first American to win a Nobel Prize in science.

References

Case Western Reserve University
University Circle
1973 sculptures
1973 establishments in Ohio
Outdoor sculptures in Ohio
Fountains in Ohio